is a Japanese manga series written and illustrated by Io Sakisaka. It was serialized in Shueisha's Bessatsu Margaret magazine from June 2015 to May 2019. Viz Media licensed the manga in English under their Shojo Beat imprint, the first volume was released in March 2020.

A live-action film adaptation opened in Japan in August 2020, while an anime film adaptation produced by A-1 Pictures premiered in September 2020.

As of July 2020, the manga had over 5.5 million copies in circulation. In 2018, Love Me, Love Me Not won the 63rd Shogakukan Manga Award in the shōjo category.

Plot
Yuna Ichihara is in the spring before her first year of high school and is pained to be separated from her best friend Sacchan who is moving away. On her way to the train station, she is stopped by a random girl who asks her for money for her train fare. Although Yuna is somewhat afraid and reluctant, she gives the girl money, who in turns give Yuna her bracelet as a promise she will meet her tomorrow to pay her back. On the same day, Yuna runs twice into a boy who looks like the idolized prince of her childhood who she referred to as her first love. After the girl, named Akari, returns Yuna's money, they head home together only to find out that they live in the same apartment building. The girls instantly become friends. However, they find that they explore love in completely different ways, and Yuna may be in love with Akari's younger brother and Akari in love with Yuna's childhood friend.

Characters
 

Portrayed by: Riko Fukumoto
A shy girl who loves to read romance shōjo manga, but has never experienced love herself. Her best friend, Sacchan, moves away after they graduate middle school, and Yuna worries that she will be alone in high school. However, when she unexpectedly meets Akari at the train station and befriends her. Due to Yuna's wary and shy personality, she is initially suspicious of Akari following her home, when they are actually just neighbors in the same apartment building. She is in love with Rio, Akari's step-younger brother. She confesses the first time but is rejected due to Rio's love for Akari. Later on, however, she confesses a second time and Rio happily accepts her as his girlfriend.

Portrayed by: Minami Hamabe
Yuna's apartment neighbor who is also a first year in high school. She initially has a boyfriend at the beginning of the series, but he later breaks up with her. Her step-younger brother is Rio, whom Yuna is in love with. She thinks that Yuna's childhood friend, Inui, is a good guy and initially tries to push the two together but stops when she finds out that Yuna is in love with Rio. She eventually grows closer to Inui and falls in love with him. Akari's mother married Rio's father recent to the series beginning, and hates that her mother doesn't trust her and Rio alone together. She pretends to not know that Rio loved her but actually has known since the beginning of the series. Both are able to reconcile, with the help of Yuna, which gives way for both to be able to move on. By the end of the manga, Akari is living in America with her parents and eagerly awaits Inui who has decided to move to America to be with her. 

Portrayed by: Takumi Kitamura
Akari's step-younger brother and the boy of Yuna's affection. He is asked out by many girls but claims he only likes pretty faces, and rejects the girls. He knew Akari before his father married her mother and was in love with her. Akari's mother knows this and is suspicious of Rio spending time alone with Akari. Rio develops a close friendship with Yuna early on in the series, often confiding in her when he found himself frustrated over Akari. He eventually falls for Yuna, but is hesitant to confess due to the fact that his friend has also fallen for Yuna. Both compete for her affection, but eventually he musters up the courage to confess at the same time that Yuna confesses to him that she is still in love with him. Both become a couple and are happily attending college together at the end of the manga.

Portrayed by: Eiji Akaso
Yuna's childhood friend. Akari describes him as a "good guy" and wishes that Yuna and him would get together. Inui has often been referred to as an "airhead" by Akari due to his carefree and sincere nature. He and Akari both develop feelings for each other, but he rejects her confession out of consideration for Rio's feelings. After he finds out Rio has moved on, he confesses to Akari. He faces some trouble when Akari's ex-boyfriend comes back into the picture and especially so when Akari decides to move to America, but he asks her to wait for him. By the end of the manga, he meets with Akari at the airport as he has decided to also live in America to pursue his dream and to be with her.

Production
The series was announced in Bessatsu Margaret June 2015 issue. Io Sakisaka reflected on plot lines in her previous series, Ao Haru Ride, and wanted to display love experiences in a different way. The original Japanese title was inspired by a tagline from an advertisement campaign for acne from the 1980s that became popular among schoolgirls; the tagline claimed certain locations of where acne appeared on the face foretold if the person or the person's admirer like or are ignoring each other.

Media

Manga

Live-action film
A live-action film directed by Takahiro Miki was released on August 14, 2020. It stars Eiji Akaso as Kazuomi Inui and Minami Hamabe as Akari Yamamoto. Riko Fukumoto plays Yuna Ichihara and Takumi Kitamura plays Rio Yamamoto. Official Hige Dandism performed the theme song with "115man Kilo no Film".

Anime film
On April 22, 2019, it was announced by Shueisha that the series would receive an anime film adaptation by A-1 Pictures. It was originally scheduled to premiere on May 29, 2020, but was delayed to September 18, 2020, due to the COVID-19 pandemic in Japan. The film is directed by Toshimasa Kuroyanagi, with Erika Yoshida handling the film's scripts, Yuu Yamashita designing the characters, and Yuuji Nomi composing the film's music. The theme song for the film is "Gravity" by Bump of Chicken. The main cast members from the live-action film also have cameo roles in the film.

Reception
Love Me, Love Me Not won the 63rd Shogakukan Manga Award in the shōjo category in 2018. In 2017, it was nominated for the 41st Kodansha Manga Award in the shōjo category.

As of July 2020, the manga had over 5.5 million copies in circulation. Volume 3 debuted at #4 on Oricon's Japanese Comic Ranking; and peaked at #2; and sold an estimated 325,010 copies in Japan. Volume 4 debuted at #1 and sold an estimated 168,863 copies in its first week alone. It sold an estimated 293,419 copies in a month and consistently ranked from October to November. Volume 4 debuted with 168,863 copies. Volume 5 debuted at #6, selling 110,175 copies; in its first week and peaking at #1 in its second week with 121,903 additional copies sold.

References

External links
  
 

Anime postponed due to the COVID-19 pandemic
Manga adapted into films
Romance anime and manga
Shōjo manga
Shueisha manga
Viz Media manga
Winners of the Shogakukan Manga Award for shōjo manga
Japanese romance films